Meng Kang is a fictional character in Water Margin, one of the Four Great Classical Novels in Chinese literature. Nicknamed "Jade Flagpole", he ranks 70th among the 108 Stars of Destiny and 34th among the 72 Earthly Fiends.

Background
Tall and thin, Meng Kang is nicknamed "Jade Flagpole" for his fair complexion. He is from Zhending Prefecture (真定府; around present-day Zhengding County, Hebei).

Becoming an outlaw
The Song court commandeers men like Meng Kang, who is an expert in building boats, to construct sailing vessels for the purpose of transporting rare plants and rocks from all over the empire to the capital Dongjing (東京; present-day Kaifeng, Henan) to decorate an imperial park. Meng Kang's project supervisor is overbearing and demanding, often punishing him for minor faults. In a fit of anger he kills the man and goes on the run. He subsequently joins Deng Fei, who leads a bandit gang at Yinma River (飲馬川; in present-day Ji County, Tianjin). Later they make Pei Xuan, an upright magistrate's clerk who has been framed by his corrupt superiors and whom they incidentally rescued when he was escorted past Yinma River in his exile to a distant island, their leader.

When Dai Zong and Yang Lin are searching for Gongsun Sheng around Jizhou, who has left  Liangshan Marsh to visit his mother, they come by Yinma River. The bandits block their way, but Yang Lin recognises Deng Fei, an old friend. The bandits, led by Pei Xuan, accept Dai Zong's invitation to join Liangshan.

Campaigns and death
Meng Kang is placed in charge of the building of boats, especially battle vessels, after the 108 Stars of Destiny came together in what is called the "Grand Assembly". He participates in the campaigns against the Liao invaders and rebel forces on Song territory following amnesty from Emperor Huizong for Liangshan.

In the attack on Black Dragon Ridge (烏龍嶺; northeast of present-day Meicheng Town, Jiande, Zhejiang) in the campaign against Fang La, Meng Kang is trapped by the enemy and blasted into bits by cannon.

References
 
 
 
 
 
 
 

72 Earthly Fiends
Fictional characters from Hebei